Obou Narcisse Olivier Kapo (born 27 September 1980), known as Olivier Kapo, is a French former professional footballer who played as an attacking midfielder or left winger.

Club career

Early career
Born in Marcory, Ivory Coast, Kapo began his professional career with Auxerre in 1999. He joined Juventus on a free transfer in the summer of 2004, but he struggled to adapt to life in Turin and did not play much as he was behind Pavel Nedvěd in the left midfield role. As a result, he was loaned to Monaco for the 2005–06 season.

When Juventus were forcibly relegated to Serie B, Kapo returned to Turin, but went back on loan due to the abundance of midfielders. He signed for Spanish La Liga club Levante, scoring five goals in 32 appearances.

Birmingham City

Kapo signed for Birmingham City on 29 June 2007 for a fee of £3 million. He claimed to have rejected other offers to sign for the club, suggesting his style of play was better suited to English football. He scored on his Premier League debut, against Chelsea in a 3–2 defeat on 12 August 2007.

Wigan Athletic
Kapo signed for Wigan Athletic on 16 July 2008, signing a three-year deal for a fee reported as £3.5 million, a move which reunited him with former manager Steve Bruce. He scored his first goal for Wigan in a 4–1 League Cup win over Ipswich Town on 24 September 2008, and his first league goal in a 2–1 defeat to Chelsea on 28 February 2009. On 8 January 2010, Kapo moved to Boulogne on a six-month loan deal, and left Wigan by mutual consent in August 2010.

Celtic
On 4 November 2010, Kapo signed for Celtic on an 18-month deal. He was allocated the number 77 jersey. He stated he turned down better money from other clubs to sign for the Glasgow side, including an offer from Bundesliga club SC Freiburg. He was encouraged to join the club after consulting with his friend, ex-Celtic player Jean-Joël Perrier-Doumbé. Kapo made his debut against St Johnstone at home in the Scottish Premier League as a second-half substitute, hitting the bar and then assisting the second goal in a 2–0 victory. He was released from his Celtic contract in January 2011, although the player claimed he walked out on the club because they had unilaterally changed the terms of his contract.

Al Ahli SC
In February 2011, Kapo signed for Qatar club Al Ahli SC on a five-month contract. He scored twice to help Al Ahli to only their second win of the season, beating Qatar SC 3–1. After only five appearances and two league goals, he terminated his contract with the club of the Persian Gulf during the following summer.

Return to Auxerre
He signed an 18-month contract with former club Auxerre in January 2012, after a few weeks spent training with the club.

Levadiakos FC
When his contract expired, Kapo signed a two-year deal with Superleague Greece club Levadiakos. In September 2014, he stated in the French media that "everything is corrupted in Greek football, mafia-controlled, while FIFA and UEFA simply don't care".

Korona Kielce
On 15 August 2014, Kapo signed a one-year contract with the Polish Ekstraklasa side Korona Kielce. He scored his first goal for Korona in the matchday 12, as his team drew 2–2 with Lech Poznań. In total, he scored seven goals. After the 2014–15 Ekstraklasa season, his contract was not extended.

International career
Kapo won nine caps for France. He represented his country in the 2003 Confederations Cup, scoring against New Zealand, and was a substitute in the final as France beat Cameroon. He has also scored in friendlies against Egypt and Serbia and Montenegro. Kapo's last cap came in 2004.

Personal life
His nephew, Maxen, is a footballer who turned professional with Paris Saint-Germain and made his senior debut with Lausanne-Sport.

Honours
Auxerre
Coupe de France: 2002–03France'''
FIFA Confederations Cup: 2003

References

External links

1980 births
Living people
French footballers
Association football midfielders
France international footballers
French sportspeople of Ivorian descent
AJ Auxerre players
Juventus F.C. players
AS Monaco FC players
Levante UD footballers
Birmingham City F.C. players
Wigan Athletic F.C. players
US Boulogne players
Celtic F.C. players
Al Ahli SC (Doha) players
Levadiakos F.C. players
Korona Kielce players
Ligue 1 players
Serie A players
La Liga players
Premier League players
Scottish Premier League players
Qatar Stars League players
Ligue 2 players
Super League Greece players
Ekstraklasa players
2003 FIFA Confederations Cup players
FIFA Confederations Cup-winning players
Footballers from Abidjan
Ivorian emigrants to France
French expatriate footballers
French expatriate sportspeople in Italy
French expatriate sportspeople in Spain
French expatriate sportspeople in England
French expatriate sportspeople in Scotland
French expatriate sportspeople in Greece
French expatriate sportspeople in Qatar
Expatriate footballers in Italy
Expatriate footballers in Spain
Expatriate footballers in England
Expatriate footballers in Scotland
Expatriate footballers in Qatar
Expatriate footballers in Poland
Black French sportspeople